Jerome Joyce may refer to:

 Jerome H. Joyce (1865–1924), president of the Aero Club of Baltimore and hotel owner
 Jerome J. Joyce (1939–2019), American farmer, businessman, and politician